The Duida woodcreeper (Lepidocolaptes duidae) is a species of bird in the subfamily Dendrocolaptinae. It is found in northwest Amazonia in Brazil, Colombia, Ecuador, Peru, and Venezuela. Its natural habitat is subtropical or tropical moist lowland forests. It, along with the Guianan Woodcreeper, Inambari Woodcreeper, and the Dusky-capped Woodcreeper were formerly considered one species, the Lineated Woodcreeper.

References

 

Duida woodcreeper
Birds of the Amazon Basin
Birds of the Ecuadorian Amazon
Birds of the Peruvian Amazon
Birds of the Venezuelan Amazon
Duida woodcreeper
Duida woodcreeper